Mount Doumani is a prominent mountain,  high, standing between Johns Glacier and Kansas Glacier at the north side of Watson Escarpment. It was mapped by the United States Geological Survey from ground surveys and U.S. Navy air photos, 1960–63, and was named by the Advisory Committee on Antarctic Names for George A. Doumani, a geologist with the Byrd Station winter party in 1959. Doumani explored the Horlick Mountains area that year and in 1960–61, 1961–62 and 1964–65. He visited the Mount Weaver area in 1962–63.

References 

Mountains of Marie Byrd Land